Ukhra Assembly constituency was an assembly constituency in Paschim Bardhaman district in the Indian state of West Bengal. It was reserved for scheduled castes.

Overview
As per orders of the Delimitation Commission, Ukhra Assembly constituency ceased to exist and No. 275 Pandaveswar assembly constituency was created from 2011. It covers Pandabeswar and Faridpur-Durgapur community development blocks.
Pandaveswar assembly segment is part of No. 40 Asansol (Lok Sabha constituency).

For Members of Legislative Assembly in the Ukhra (Lok Sabha constituency), see Pandaveswar Assembly constituency.

Election results

1977-2006
Madan Bauri of CPI (M) won the Ukhra (SC) assembly seat in 2006 and 2001 defeating his nearest rivals Upender Paswan of JD(U) and Nirmal Maji of Trinamool Congress respectively. Lakhan Bagdi of CPI (M) won the seat in 1996, 1991, 1987, 1982 and 1977, defeating Jethu Ram of Congress in 1996, Gopal Mondal of Congress in 1991, Haradhan Mondal of Congress in 1987 and 1982, and Gopal Mondal of Congress in 1977.

1969-1972
Gopal Mondal of INC won the seat in 1972. Lakhan Bagdi of CPI (M) won the seat in 1971 and 1969. Prior to that the Ukhra constituency was not there.

Ukhra assembly constituency was part of Asansol (Lok Sabha constituency).

Impact of delimitation
As per orders of the Delimitation Commission, Ukhra Assembly constituency has ceased to be an assembly constituency from 2011. Andal community development block is part of Raniganj, West Bengal Assembly constituency.

References

Former assembly constituencies of West Bengal
Politics of Paschim Bardhaman district